The Hare and Hounds is a  Young's  public house at Upper Richmond Road, East Sheen, in the London Borough of Richmond upon Thames. It is Grade II listed. A former coaching inn, it was built by an unknown architect in the early 19th century. It has a 1930s interior and an extensive garden.

References

External links
Official website

19th-century establishments in the United Kingdom
Buildings and structures completed in the 19th century
Coaching inns
East Sheen
Grade II listed buildings in the London Borough of Richmond upon Thames
Grade II listed pubs in London
Pubs in the London Borough of Richmond upon Thames